Fools is the third studio album by Canadian rock band, The Reason.

Track listing
"Come and Go" - 5:22
"Where Do We Go From Here" - 3:36
"Run" - 3:16
"Cry Like The Rain" - 3:40
"That's All I Know" - 3:50
"The Ending Of Us All" - 3:06
"Dogs" - 3:28
"Work With Me" - 4:23
"I'll Be Around" - 3:27
"My Love Is Gone" - 3:42
"The Longest Highway Home" - 3:33

- produced and engineered by Steven Haigler
|
-engineered by Jon Ashley
|
- Mixed by Vic Florencia, except "Come & Go" mixed by Steven Haigler

The Reason (band) albums
2010 albums